David Wallace is a United States Army officer and Republican politician currently serving in the Arkansas Senate since 2017.

Biography
Wallace graduated from Leachville High School and Arkansas State University, where he was part of the ROTC program. After graduation, he was commissioned as a lieutenant in the U.S. Army, flying attack helicopters during the Vietnam War and eventually rising to the rank of Lieutenant Colonel.

Wallace founded a business specializing in disaster relief, Wallace Resources. He is married to Karen Wallace, with whom he had two children, and is a member of the Southern Baptist Church.

Electoral history
Wallace won his Senate seat after defeating Democratic incumbent David Burnett 60.4% to 39.0% in the 2016 election, thus flipping the district. Previously, he served one term in the Arkansas House of Representatives, flipping that district upon winning the election there as well. He and fellow state senator James Sturch swapped districts during redistricting before the 2022 elections, putting Wallace in the 19th district for his third term.

References

21st-century American politicians
Living people
Republican Party Arkansas state senators
Republican Party members of the Arkansas House of Representatives
Year of birth missing (living people)